Morus indica is a member of the genus Morus, of the family of flowering plants Moraceae, commonly known as the mulberry family. As with other mulberries, Morus indica is a deciduous tree. Morus indica is native to the temperate and sub-tropical Himalayan region. It is currently cultivated in India, China, Japan, and East Africa.

Description 
Morus indica, as with other members of the mulberry family, is often described as either a small tree or a shrub, rarely exceeding . When young, the branches are covered in fine, soft hairs known as; however, the plant loses these hair as they grow older. The branches are a light gray-brown color.

The leaves themselves are usually ovate but sometimes lobed, coming to a narrow point, making them somewhere between caudate and acuminate. The leaves are retuse to slightly cordate, having a small lobe at the base. They are shortly serrated, with each tooth narrowing to a thin point, making them apiculate. The leaf colour is dark green, with a paler underside covered in fine hairs.

Flowers and fruit 

Morus indica is a monoecious flowering plant, having male and female flowers growing on the same tree, although often on distinct branches. The female flowers are subglubose, or just shy of spherical. The stigma of these flowers is about 3.5 mm long with dense, short hair.

The female flower, after being fertilized, forms a fleshy compound fruit known as a syncarp. This syncarp, which is black when fully ripe, looks like that of Morus nigra, commonly known as a black mulberry.

Uses and health 
Morus indica is often grown for its medicinal properties. As with most berries, the mulberries of M. indica have potent antioxidant properties. The primary medicinal use of M. indica is as a method of regulating blood glucose levels in diabetic patients. Multiple studies in humans and mice have found that the use of M. indica lowered the blood glucose levels of diabetics through multiple different pathways.

References 

indica
Berries
Medicinal plants
Taxa named by Carl Linnaeus